is a Japanese football player. He plays for Gamba Osaka.

Career
Katsuki Umezu joined Gamba Osaka in 2016. On, he debuted in J3 League (v AC Nagano Parceiro).

Reserves performance

Last Updated: 3 December 2017

References

External links

1999 births
Living people
Association football people from Nara Prefecture
Japanese footballers
J1 League players
J3 League players
Gamba Osaka players
Gamba Osaka U-23 players
Association football midfielders